Chrysoconia is a genus of fungi within the Coniophoraceae family. This is a monotypic genus, containing the single species Chrysoconia orthospora, found in Lake Union, Washington.

References

External links
 

Boletales
Monotypic Boletales genera